Arendsvlei is a South African soap opera. Featuring an almost all-Coloured cast, it premiered on 1 October 2018 as kykNET & Kie's first telenovela. It was originally intended to be a limited series spanning one year, its first season picking up two SAFTAs. Due to popular demand, Arendsvlei was renewed for a second season in August 2019 and a third in August 2020.

The series hit 500 episodes in August 2021.

Premise
The series centres on a prestigious school, its administration, and the families associated with it in a fictional community of the Cape Flats called Arendsvlei.

Cast

Main
 Jolene Martin as Beatrice Abrahams, Arendsvlei High vice-principal
 Oscar Petersen as David Abrahams, Arendsvlei High principal
 Maria Valente de Almeida as Samantha Abrahams, Beatrice and David's daughter and school captain
 Sherman Pharo as Thys Cupido, Beatrice's brother and co-founder of Arendsvlei High
 Crystal-Donna Roberts as Janice Cupido, Thys' wife
 Celeste Matthews as Aunty Gertie Cupido, matriarch of the Cupidos
 Ann Juries-May as Claudia Cupido, Thys and Janice's daughter
 Rehane Abrahams as Wendy Newman, the Cupidos' adversary who runs the WendyHouse restaurant
 Kay Smith as Debra Newman, Wendy's daughter
 Melanie du Bois as Ronel Foster, Beatrice's friend and an aspiring actress
 Roberto Kyle as Lee-Roy Foster, Ronel's son who transfers to Arendsvlei High to escape bullying
 Jody Abrahams as Lionel Foster, Lee-Roy's negligent father with ulterior motives for moving to Arendsvlei

Supporting
 Ernest St Clair as Christopher February, teacher at Arendsvlei High
 Dillon Windvogel as Vernon Booysen, an ambitious student who gets in an accident
 Christian Bennett as Emile February, a gardener who helps out at WendyHouse
 Craig Adriaanse as Wesley Roussow, a student with a troubled past
 Gerwen Simon as Valdonia Lee Matthews
 Menicia Sass as Chantel Williams
 Gretchen Ramsden as Nicolene
 Joseph Mitchell as Uncle Johnny
 Ceagan Arendse as Woelag (seasons 1–2)
 Elton Landrew as Steve Mortlock (seasons 1–2), Janice's brother
 Danny Ross as Nathan Koopman (seasons 2–3)
 Maurice Carpede as Ridwaan "Waanie" Matthews (season 2), Chantel's father
 Shaleen Surtie-Richards as Muriel Foster (seasons 2–4), Lionel's mother
 Zenobia Kloppers as Aunty Emily (season 2)
 Quanita Adams as Mother Laetitia (seasons 2–3)
 Jarrid Geduld as Gavin "Bombie" Galant (seasons 2–3)
 Cantona James as Daniel Lafras (season 2)
 Antoinette Louw as Advocate Rina Botha (seasons 2–3)
 Ilse Klink as Dorothy Galant (season 3), matriarch of the Galants
 Chelsea Thomas as Angelique Galant (season 3), Dorothy's daughter
 Nancia Dorland as Candice Burger (season 3), Angelique's friend
 Carmen Maarman as Natalie Burger (season 3), Candice's stepmother
 Chad Baai as Kaleb Jakobs (season 3)
 Brendon Daniels as Constable Krige (season 3), detective and Lionel's friend
 Inge Isaacs as Emmie Langeveld (season 3), new student at Arendsvlei
 Clayton Evertson as Jake Sylvester (season 3)

Production
Arendsvlei is based on a concept Theltom Masimila brainstormed and originally penned as a short story. He serves as its head writer and co-producer. Masimila makes a point of the Afrikaans dialect used in the series being "authentically Cape-based". Also in the writers' room are Wilmien Rossouw, the head storyliner, as well as Ilse Oppelt, Margaret Goldsmid, Henry Cloete, Quanita Adams, Johann Davis and Retief Scholtz. The series is directed by Denny Y. Miller and produced by Penguin Films. Roberta Durrant was the creative director for season 2.

It is filmed at Atlantic Studios in Milnerton.

Reception

Awards and nominations

Notes

References

External links

Arendsvlei at TVSA

2010s high school television series
2020s high school television series
2018 South African television series debuts
KykNET original programming
South African television soap operas
Afrikaans-language television shows